Hillington West railway station is located in the Hillington district of Glasgow, Scotland, also serving the western portion of the large Hillington industrial estate (which is part of the town of Renfrew) to the north, and the Penilee neighbourhood (within Glasgow) to the south. The station, is managed by ScotRail and is on the Inverclyde Line.

History 
The station opened on 1 April 1940 as Hillington. The station was renamed Hillington West on 3 March 1952.

Services
A few  trains call in the peaks and also in the evenings (once per hour each way after 18:30 to maintain the overall frequency, as the Gourock service drops to hourly). On Sundays the Gourock - Glasgow trains call hourly. The station is served by a staffed ticket office, 07:14 to 14:14 Monday to Saturday.

Footnotes

References 

Butt, R. V. J. (1995). The Directory of Railway Stations. Patrick Stephens Ltd, Sparkford, .

External links 

Railway stations in Glasgow
Former London, Midland and Scottish Railway stations
Railway stations in Great Britain opened in 1940
SPT railway stations
Railway stations served by ScotRail